Nasirabad (also Romanized as Naşīrābād) is a village in Hemmatabad Rural District, in the Central District of Borujerd County, Lorestan Province, Iran. At the 2006 census, its population was 211, in 49 families.

References 

Towns and villages in Borujerd County